Arantxa Sánchez Vicario and Helena Suková defeated Jana Novotná and Larisa Savchenko-Neiland in the final, 7–6(7–4), 6–1 to win the doubles tennis title at the 1992 Virginia Slims Championships.

Martina Navratilova and Pam Shriver were the defending champions, but were defeated in the semifinals by Sánchez Vicario and Suková.

Seeds

Draw

Draw

External links
 Official Results Archive (ITF)
 Official Results Archive (WTA)

References

Doubles
1992 WTA Tour